The Stade Communal de Namur is a football stadium in Namur, Belgium.  It is currently the home ground of Union Royale Namur. The stadium holds 3,500.

External links
 Frank Jasperneite page

Football venues in Wallonia
Sports venues in Namur (province)
Sport in Namur (city)
Buildings and structures in Namur (city)